Kerr House may refer to:

in the United States (by state then city)
Kerr-Booth House, Searcy, Arkansas, listed on the NRHP in White County, Arkansas
Kerr House (Denver, Colorado), listed on the National Register of Historic Places in Southeast Denver, Colorado
Andrew Kerr House, Newark, Delaware, NRHP-listed
William Kerr House, Union City, Randolph County, Indiana, NRHP-listed
Thomas Shelby House, near Lexington, Missouri, also known as Kerr House, NRHP-listed 
Kerr House (Kalispell, Montana), listed on the National Register of Historic Places in Flathead County, Montana
Gen. William Kerr House, Enochville, Rowan County, North Carolina, NRHP-listed
James Kerr House, Kerr, Sampson County, North Carolina, NRHP-listed
Kerr-Patton House, Thompson, Alamance County, North Carolina, NRHP-listed
Benjamin F. Kerr House, Grand Rapids, Ohio, listed on the NRHP in Wood County, Ohio
Whidden–Kerr House and Garden, near Portland, Oregon, NRHP-listed
Dr. Thomas R. Kerr House and Office, Oakmont, Pennsylvania, NRHP-listed
Macklin Kerr House, Maryville, Tennessee, listed on the NRHP in Blount County, Tennessee
Ploeger-Kerr-White House, Bastrop, Texas, listed on the NRHP in Bastrop County, Texas
Beverly and Lula Kerr House, Bastrop, Texas, listed on the NRHP in Bastrop County, Texas
Ker Place, Onancock, Virginia, NRHP-listed